Le Dourn is a commune in the Tarn department in southern France.

See also
Communes of the Tarn department

References

Dourn